Aerugite is a rare complex nickel arsenate mineral with a variably reported formula: Ni9(AsO4)2AsO6. It forms green to deep blue-green trigonal crystals. It has a Mohs hardness of 4 and a specific gravity of 5.85 to 5.95. 

It was first described in 1858 in either the South Terres mine of Cornwall, England or in Erzgebirge, Saxony, Germany. The origin is disputed. The most common occurrence is as an incrustation on furnace walls in which ores are roasted. Its name comes from the Latin word aerugo for copper rust.

See also
 List of minerals

References

Nickel minerals
Arsenate minerals
Trigonal minerals
Minerals in space group 166